Ida Gramcko (Puerto Cabello, 1924 – Caracas, 1994) was a Venezuelan essayist and poet. Her sister, Elsa Gramcko, was an abstract sculptor and painter. She was a recipient of the National Prize for Literature.

Publications
Threshold (1941)
Glass House (1944)
Against the naked heart of Heaven (1944)
The Magic Wand (1948)
Poems (1952)
Maria Lionza (1955) verse drama
Poems of a psychotic (1964)
The most murmurs (1965)
Sun and loneliness (1966)
This boulder (1967, prose and poetry)
Psalms (1968)
0 degrees North Franco (1969)
The aesthetes, the beggars, the heroes: Poems, 1958 (1970)
Sonnets of Origin (1972)
The wanderings and find. Anthology (1972)
Chores, knowledge, companies (1973)
Salto Angel (1985)
Selected Works (1988)
Treno (1993)

References

Venezuelan women poets
1924 births
1994 deaths
20th-century Venezuelan poets
20th-century Venezuelan women writers
Venezuelan women journalists